Heterotis is a genus of flowering plants belonging to the family Melastomataceae.

The genus is native to tropical Africa.

There are 6 accepted species in this genus: 
Some taxonomists include this genus and its species in the genus Dissotis.

 Heterotis buettneriana (Cogn. ex Büttner) Jacq.-Fél.
 Heterotis cogniauxiana (A.Fern. & R.Fern.) Ver.-Lib. & G.Kadereit
 Heterotis decumbens (P.Beauv.) Jacq.-Fél.
 Heterotis fruticosa (Brenan) Ver.-Lib. & G.Kadereit
 Heterotis prostrata Benth.
 Heterotis rotundifolia (Sm.) Jacq.-Fél.

References

Melastomataceae
Melastomataceae genera
Plants described in 1849
Tropical flora
Taxa named by George Bentham